The canton of Golbey is an administrative division of the Vosges department, in northeastern France. It was created at the French canton reorganisation which came into effect in March 2015. Its seat is in Golbey.

It consists of the following communes:

Chavelot
Darnieulles
Domèvre-sur-Avière
Fomerey
Frizon
Gigney
Golbey
Igney
Mazeley
Thaon-les-Vosges 
Uxegney
Vaxoncourt

References

Cantons of Vosges (department)